Gisela Elisabeth Bulla (born Gottschalk,  – ) was a German archaeologist, author, and politician. She authored several books on the subject of domestic animals. From March 1995 to September 2000, she was also the federal chairwoman of the Human Environment Animal Protection.

Biography 
From the age of six, Bulla lived in Munich. She received her PhD in classical archaeology from the Ludwig-Maximilians-Universität München in 1972 with a dissertation entitled Typologische Darstellung griechischer Innenhofhäuser. She worked as a publishing editor until 1976. Since then she has been a freelance author. Under her birth name she wrote popular books on the pharaohs, the Roman emperors and the emperors of China. She has also written a number of books on pets, focusing on cats and rats and animal abuse. In 1984, she co-authored Endzeit für Tiere with Sina Walden, a book which gained some notoriety in animal rights circles. She also wrote articles for magazines such as Emma. She was married and lived in Munich and Malta.

Political engagement 
Bulla had already been living a vegetarian lifestyle since the 1970s. In the 1990s, she joined the Animal Protection Party, which was founded in 1993. At the third federal party conference, held in Braunschweig on 11 March 1995, she was elected federal chairwoman, succeeding Ingeborg Bingener. She was confirmed in office in both 1997 and 1998. For the 1998 German federal election, Bulla was unanimously elected as the top candidate.

In the 1999 European Parliament election in Germany, she was also the top candidate for her party. With an election result of 0.7% in the European election, the Animal Protection Party participated in state party funding for the first time. She was last re-elected as party chair in January 1999. She rejected electoral alliances with other parties during her tenure, so as not to dilute the idea of animal protection.

On 8 September 2000, one day before the eighth federal party conference in Berlin, she resigned from this position, as she was elected deputy chairwoman of the party's Federal Arbitration Court the following day. First Deputy Federal chairman Egon Karp then took over as acting leader of the party for a year, before Jürgen Gerlach was elected to succeed her as party chairman on 29 September 2001.

Works 

 

 
 
 
 

 

 

 
 
 

Publication under the pseudonym of Nelly Hamilton
 

Publication under the name of Gisela Gottschalk

References

External links 

 

1932 births
2018 deaths
Non-fiction writers
20th-century German novelists
Writers from Hamburg